KN-24, officially the Hwasongpho-11Na() (Hwasong-11 improved), is a designation given to a North Korean single-stage, solid-fueled tactical ballistic missile.

Design
The KN-24 bears an external resemblance to the American MGM-140 ATACMS and likely fills a similar role of supporting battlefield operations. One difference is that its aft-mounted aerodynamic fins are fixed rather than foldable like those on the ATACMS, requiring deployment from rectangular launch canisters. It flies in a "variable ballistic trajectory," flattening out at a lower altitude (below around ) than traditional SRBMs like the Scud where the atmosphere is dense enough so the missile's fins can maintain aerodynamic control over its entire flight and dive toward the target. Use of INS updated with satellite-guidance data could make it accurate to within 100 meters CEP, or 200 meters using INS alone. Although the missile is outwardly similar to the ATACMS, it has demonstrated greater range, suggesting its physical dimensions are larger; it appears to share a common booster with the KN-23 and is estimated to carry a 400–500 kg payload with a unitary or submunition warhead. The KN-24 is likely to replace older liquid-fueled North Korean SRBMs like the Hwasong-5 and Hwasong-6, as its non-parabolic trajectory makes it more survivable against missile defense systems and its increased accuracy reduces the number of missiles that would be needed to destroy a single target.

Despite their similarities to the ATACMS system, the KN-24 is significantly larger, and likely uses the same motor as the Pukkuksong-1 with similar jet vanes, and overall resembling a single stage version of it. The launch container has a width of about 1.26 m and a wheel diameter of 0.78 m, similar to the Pukkuksong-2 tracked TEL. A number of images shown of the system appears to be manipulated, significantly increasing the size of the launcher.

With the missile fulfilling a similar role to the KN-23, there should have been no need to develop another missile later with an overlapping performance. However, in an analysis of news reports from the Korean Central News Agency, despite the differences the KN-23 possesses from the 9K720 Iskander, the KN-23 is likely to be constructed with foreign assistance or foreign parts. While all the news reports on the KN-23 mainly focused on the deployment, 'demonstration of power' and newness of it, reports on the KN-24 instead focused on the 'research' and 'development' in its first launch. Later launches of the KN-24 made mention of 'Juche weapons of Korean style', which is not mentioned at all for the KN-23, hinting that whereas the KN-24 underwent a research and development phase, whereas the KN-23 was already deployed prior to being tested and likely having foreign involvement in some form.

In the 'Self-Defence 2021' military exhibition, a beige coloured KN-24 was shown, and revealed the official name of the missile to be Hwasongpho-11Na. Since 나(Na) is second letter in hangul alphabetic order called ganada order, it means this missile is improved version or substitution of Hwasong-11 missile.

History

On 21 March 2020, two more KN-24s were fired from Sonchon to an apogee of 50 km and a range of 410 km, performing "pull-up maneuvers" in flight and one supposedly striking a small 100 meter-long island.

On January 17, 2022, two KN-24's were fired from Sunan Airport located in Pyongyang. The missiles flew 380 km and achieved an apogee of 42 km with a maximum speed of Mach 5 (1.5 - 1.8 km/s). The test fire was conducted to check operational readiness and validate build quality of mass produced KN-24's.

See also
MGM-140 ATACMS
KTSSM
KN-23

References

References 

Tactical ballistic missiles
Ballistic missiles of North Korea
Tactical ballistic missiles of North Korea